The arrondissement of Commercy is an arrondissement of France in the Meuse department in the Grand Est region. It has 135 communes.

Composition

The communes of the arrondissement of Commercy, and their INSEE codes, are:

 Abainville (55001)
 Amanty (55005)
 Apremont-la-Forêt (55012)
 Badonvilliers-Gérauvilliers (55026)
 Bannoncourt (55027)
 Baudrémont (55032)
 Belrain (55044)
 Beney-en-Woëvre (55046)
 Bislée (55054)
 Boncourt-sur-Meuse (55058)
 Bonnet (55059)
 Bouconville-sur-Madt (55062)
 Bouquemont (55064)
 Bovée-sur-Barboure (55066)
 Boviolles (55067)
 Brixey-aux-Chanoines (55080)
 Broussey-en-Blois (55084)
 Broussey-Raulecourt (55085)
 Burey-en-Vaux (55088)
 Burey-la-Côte (55089)
 Buxières-sous-les-Côtes (55093)
 Chaillon (55096)
 Chalaines (55097)
 Champougny (55100)
 Chassey-Beaupré (55104)
 Chauvoncourt (55111)
 Chonville-Malaumont (55114)
 Commercy (55122)
 Courcelles-en-Barrois (55127)
 Courouvre (55129)
 Cousances-lès-Triconville (55518)
 Dagonville (55141)
 Dainville-Bertheléville (55142)
 Delouze-Rosières (55148)
 Demange-Baudignécourt (55150)
 Dompcevrin (55159)
 Dompierre-aux-Bois (55160)
 Épiez-sur-Meuse (55173)
 Erneville-aux-Bois (55179)
 Euville (55184)
 Frémeréville-sous-les-Côtes (55196)
 Fresnes-au-Mont (55197)
 Geville (55258)
 Gimécourt (55210)
 Girauvoisin (55212)
 Gondrecourt-le-Château (55215)
 Goussaincourt (55217)
 Grimaucourt-près-Sampigny (55220)
 Han-sur-Meuse (55229)
 Heudicourt-sous-les-Côtes (55245)
 Horville-en-Ornois (55247)
 Houdelaincourt (55248)
 Jonville-en-Woëvre (55256)
 Kœur-la-Grande (55263)
 Kœur-la-Petite (55264)
 Lachaussée (55267)
 Lacroix-sur-Meuse (55268)
 Lahaymeix (55269)
 Lahayville (55270)
 Lamorville (55274)
 Laneuville-au-Rupt (55278)
 Lavallée (55282)
 Lérouville (55288)
 Levoncourt (55289)
 Lignières-sur-Aire (55290)
 Longchamps-sur-Aire (55301)
 Loupmont (55303)
 Maizey (55312)
 Marson-sur-Barboure (55322)
 Mauvages (55327)
 Maxey-sur-Vaise (55328)
 Mécrin (55329)
 Méligny-le-Grand (55330)
 Méligny-le-Petit (55331)
 Ménil-aux-Bois (55333)
 Ménil-la-Horgne (55334)
 Montbras (55344)
 Montigny-lès-Vaucouleurs (55350)
 Montsec (55353)
 Naives-en-Blois (55368)
 Nançois-le-Grand (55371)
 Neuville-en-Verdunois (55380)
 Neuville-lès-Vaucouleurs (55381)
 Nicey-sur-Aire (55384)
 Nonsard-Lamarche (55386)
 Ourches-sur-Meuse (55396)
 Pagny-la-Blanche-Côte (55397)
 Pagny-sur-Meuse (55398)
 Les Paroches (55401)
 Pierrefitte-sur-Aire (55404)
 Pont-sur-Meuse (55407)
 Rambucourt (55412)
 Ranzières (55415)
 Reffroy (55421)
 Richecourt (55431)
 Rigny-la-Salle (55433)
 Rigny-Saint-Martin (55434)
 Les Roises (55436)
 Rouvrois-sur-Meuse (55444)
 Rupt-devant-Saint-Mihiel (55448)
 Saint-Aubin-sur-Aire (55454)
 Saint-Germain-sur-Meuse (55456)
 Saint-Joire (55459)
 Saint-Julien-sous-les-Côtes (55460)
 Saint-Maurice-sous-les-Côtes (55462)
 Saint-Mihiel (55463)
 Sampigny (55467)
 Saulvaux (55472)
 Sauvigny (55474)
 Sauvoy (55475)
 Sepvigny (55485)
 Seuzey (55487)
 Sorcy-Saint-Martin (55496)
 Taillancourt (55503)
 Thillombois (55506)
 Tréveray (55516)
 Troussey (55520)
 Troyon (55521)
 Ugny-sur-Meuse (55522)
 Vadonville (55526)
 Valbois (55530)
 Varnéville (55528)
 Vaucouleurs (55533)
 Vaudeville-le-Haut (55534)
 Vaux-lès-Palameix (55540)
 Vigneulles-lès-Hattonchâtel (55551)
 Vignot (55553)
 Ville-devant-Belrain (55555)
 Villeroy-sur-Méholle (55559)
 Villotte-sur-Aire (55570)
 Void-Vacon (55573)
 Vouthon-Bas (55574)
 Vouthon-Haut (55575)
 Woimbey (55584)
 Xivray-et-Marvoisin (55586)

History

The arrondissement of Commercy was created in 1800.

As a result of the reorganisation of the cantons of France which came into effect in 2015, the borders of the cantons are no longer related to the borders of the arrondissements. The cantons of the arrondissement of Commercy were, as of January 2015:

 Commercy
 Gondrecourt-le-Château
 Pierrefitte-sur-Aire
 Saint-Mihiel
 Vaucouleurs
 Vigneulles-lès-Hattonchâtel
 Void-Vacon

References

Commercy